Sackets Harbor Village Historic District is a national historic district located at Sackets Harbor in Jefferson County, New York.  The district includes 143 contributing buildings, among a total of 156 buildings in the historic central core of the village.  The majority of the buildings were constructed during the 1st century of European-American settlement, 1801 to 1900.

It was listed on the National Register of Historic Places in 1983.

References

Historic districts on the National Register of Historic Places in New York (state)
Historic districts in Jefferson County, New York
National Register of Historic Places in Jefferson County, New York